A functor, in mathematics, is a map between categories.

Functor may also refer to:
 Predicate functor in logic, a basic concept of predicate functor logic
 Function word in linguistics
 In computer programming:
Functor (functional programming)
Function object used to pass function pointers along with state information
 for use of the term in Prolog language, see Prolog syntax and semantics
 In OCaml and Standard ML, a functor is a higher-order module (a module parameterized by one or more other modules), often used to define type-safe abstracted algorithms and data structures.

See also 
 Function (disambiguation)